Events from the year 1780 in Denmark.

Incumbents
 Monarch – Christian VII
 Prime minister – Ove Høegh-Guldberg

Events
August - Denmark-Norway joins the First League of Armed Neutrality.

References

 
Years of the 18th century in Denmark
Denmark
Denmark
1780s in Denmark